Tamme Stadium is a multi-purpose stadium in Tartu, Estonia, located in the district of Tammelinn. First opened in 1932 and reaching its current look in 2011, the stadium is home to Tartu Tammeka and holds 1,638 people.

History
The original sports park was designed in 1928 by the architect Arnold Matteus. The work was completed in 1932 and in 1936, a grandstand was added. Since then the stadium has been used for games in the Estonian Football League. There have been numerous international athletic competitions held in the stadium, and also Estonian Song Festivals.

Tamme Stadium was the home ground for Tartu Olümpia, who became the Estonian champions in 1940, after beating Tallinna Kalev 3–1 in the final round of the 1939–40 Estonian Football Championship season. Until this day, Tartu Olümpia are the only non-Tallinn team that has lifted the Estonian Football Championship title.

In the 1960s the stadium was extensively renovated and reopened in 1973. However, a major fire destroyed much of the stadium complex in 1997, which led to a new building by the architects Andres Siim and Kristel Ausing.

Extensive renovation took place in 2007/2008 costing about 14 million Kroons (900,000 euros).

2010–2011 renovation cost about 4 million euros. The new stadium can hold any international athletics or football competition.

On 3 July 2014, the stadium hosted its first and only UEFA Europa League qualification match, when Estonian third-tier club Tartu Santos faced Tromsø in front of 1,169 spectators.

It was also the home ground for Tartu SK 10.

Estonia national team matches 
Tartu Tamme Stadium has hosted the Estonia national football team twice, with both matches taking place in June 2012.

Gallery

References

External links

 Official site

Football venues in Estonia
Sport in Tartu
Multi-purpose stadiums in Estonia
1932 establishments in Estonia
Event venues established in 1932
Buildings and structures in Tartu
Athletics (track and field) venues in Estonia